Michael Lee Slaton (born September 25, 1964 in Sacramento, California) is a former cornerback and safety in the National Football League

After graduating Bellevue West High School, Slaton played college football for the University of South Dakota. In 2004, he was inducted in the Coyote Sports Hall of Fame.  He was drafted by the Minnesota Vikings in the 1986 NFL Draft.

References 
 Eight Individuals Inducted into the Coyote Sports Hall of Fame
 The Pro Football Encyclopedia

1964 births
Living people
Players of American football from Sacramento, California
American football cornerbacks
American football safeties
South Dakota Coyotes football players
Minnesota Vikings players
People from Bellevue, Nebraska
People from Sarpy County, Nebraska
National Football League replacement players